The Philippine College of Health Sciences, Inc. is a school founded by Dr. George Cordero in 1993. It is located at 1813 Recto Avenue in Manila.

History

The Philippine College of Health Sciences, Inc. (PCHS) was created on February 1, 1993, the birthday of its first President and Chief Executive Officer (CEO), Dr. George C. Cordero.

The School was conceived as complementary to Dr. Cordero’s review center, the Institute of Review and Special Studies, popularly known as the INRESS REVIEW Center. The first PCHS location was a 3-story rented building with 10 classrooms, which was located on Coromina St., along Claro M. Recto Avenue, Manila. Dr. Cordero received his investiture as President in 1996.

PCHS opened its doors in June 1994 with 124 students. The first baccalaureate courses it offered were in Nursing, in Physical Therapy, Occupational Therapy, Radiologic Technology and Psychology. They also offer Associate's degrees in Radiologic Rechnology (A.R.T) and Graduate in Midwifery (G.M). Its post-graduate courses include Master of Arts in Nursing (M.A.N), Master of Arts in Education (M.A.E.d), Master of Public Administration (M.P.A), Doctor of Education (Ed.D) and Doctor of Philosophy (PhD). In the following years its student population exceeded one thousand, and it almost reached three thousand student enrollments.

Dr. Cordero transferred to his newly acquired building, the Doña Narcisa Building, along Quezon Boulevard.PCHS is trying to purchase the defunct College of Holy spirit in mendiola for more spacious campus.

Physical / Clinical Resources
PCHS is affiliated with the following major institutions for clinical education:

V. Luna (Armed Forces of the Philippines) Medical Center
Veterans Memorial Medical Center
Quirino Memorial Medical Center
Quezon City General Hospital
National Center for Mental Health
Philippine Orthopedic Center
San Lazaro Hospital
Dr. Jose Fabella Memorial Hospital
Ospital ng Maynila
Mandaluyong City Medical Center
Gat. Andres Bonifacio Memorial Medical Center

PCHS is also affiliated with the following health centers for the community involvement of its students:

Quezon City Health Department
Manila City Health Department
San Juan Health Department
Caloocan Health Department

Academic programs

The School offers the following programs from Diploma, Bachelor's, Master's, and Doctoral levels:

Undergraduate Studies

College of Nursing & Midwifery

Bachelor of Science in Nursing
Midwifery Course

College of Medical Technology

Bachelor of Science in Medical Technology

College of Pharmacy

Bachelor of Science in Pharmacy

College of Radiologic Technology

Bachelor of Science in Radiologic Technology

College of Rehabilitation Sciences

Bachelor of Science in Physical Therapy
Bachelor of Science in Occupational Therapy

 College of Criminology

Bachelor of Science in Criminology

College of Education

Bachelor of Secondary Education major in:
Mathematics
Biological Science
English
Bachelor of Elementary Education major in
Special Education
Bachelor of Science in Psychology

Postgraduate Studies

Master of Arts in Nursing,  major in
Community Health Nursing
Maternal and Child Nursing
Mental Health and Psychiatric Nursing
Medical and Surgical Nursing
Nursing Administration
Nursing Education
Master of Public Administration
Master of Arts in Education, major in
English
Mathematics
Doctor of Education, major in Educational Management
Doctor of Philosophy, major in Management
Doctor of Philosophy, major in Mathematics

Student Organization

Philippine Nursing Student Association

Publication

Murmuray Newspaper The College official student publication.

References
pchsinconline.com/
http://www.pchsinconline.com/index.php?option=com_content&task=view&id=47&Itemid=72
°http://newsinfo.inquirer.net/664069/prc-examiner-found-guilty-of-leaking-nursing-test-questions

Educational institutions established in 1993
Education in Sampaloc, Manila
Universities and colleges in Manila
Nursing schools in the Philippines
1993 establishments in the Philippines